Eddie Valiant is the main protagonist of the novel Who Censored Roger Rabbit?, and the film adaptation, Who Framed Roger Rabbit.

Who Censored Roger Rabbit?
In the original novel Who Censored Roger Rabbit?, Eddie Valiant is a fictional Los Angeles-based private detective hired by comic book star Roger Rabbit to investigate the workings of Roger's corrupt employers, the DeGreasy Brothers. When Roger is found dead, and his final words having been censored out, Valiant is soon sent on the case of tracking Roger's murderers. This original incarnation of Eddie is a heavy smoker and has a beard as well as being more muscular and chiseled featured than he appears in the film.

Who Framed Roger Rabbit
The 1988 film gives insight into the character, as portrayed by Bob Hoskins. Pictures and newspaper clippings in his office reveal that he and his brother Theodore ("Teddy" for short) were sons of a circus clown; they joined the police force in 1925 and started their own private investigation service in 1938. The brothers quickly established a reputation for rescuing Toons in trouble, such as solving the kidnapping of Donald Duck's nephews and clearing Goofy of espionage charges. In 1942, while they were investigating a robbery in Toontown, an unknown bank robber (later revealed to be Judge Doom) dropped a piano on them from 15 stories up. Eddie survived but broke his arm, however Teddy was killed instantly. The tragedy left Eddie with a distaste for Toons in general; his business collapsed, losing the respect of most of the police force and he became an alcoholic, suffering from PTSD and depression. Eddie began living in the office he and Teddy had shared and left Teddy's desk as a memorial to him, refusing to dust it or let anyone sit in his chair.

5 years later, R.K. Maroon, head of the Maroon Cartoons studio, hires Valiant to photograph Jessica Rabbit, Roger's wife; she is literally "playing pattycake" with Marvin Acme, owner of Toontown and founder of the Acme Corporation. When Acme is murdered and Roger becomes the prime suspect, Valiant teams up with Roger to expose the culprit. Maroon is subsequently killed, and Valiant discovers that Doom is responsible for not only these two deaths, but Teddy's as well. He destroys Doom at Acme's warehouse, finds Acme's lost will that bequeaths Toontown to the Toons, and lives happily-ever-after, having avenged his brother's death and rid himself of both his bigotry and alcoholism.

Appearances in other media
In the graphic novel of the film published in 1989 by Marvel Comics, Valiant is the narrator of the story, telling the film through his eyes and in the style of a detective story. According to Roger Rabbit: The Resurrection of Doom, Valiant eats jellybeans to cope with his new-found teetotalism. In the novel Who P-P-P-Plugged Roger Rabbit?, Valiant has once again vowed to no longer take any Toon cases, but is forced to do so when Baby Herman is found dead.

Fictional private investigators
Who Framed Roger Rabbit
Literary characters introduced in 1981
Fictional alcohol abusers
Fictional characters with major depressive disorder
Fictional characters with post-traumatic stress disorder
Fictional people from the 20th-century
Disney characters originating in film
Characters in American novels of the 20th century